Haralampije Polenaković (Gostivar, 17 January 1909 – Skopje 15 February 1984), was a Macedonian literary historian and lexicographer.

Polenaković was born into a family of ethnic Serbs in the town of Gostivar, which was then part of the Ottoman Empire. He graduated from Philosophical Faculty in Skopje and then continued his studies in Zagreb where he obtained a PhD. During the Bulgarian occupation of Macedonia in World War Two he escaped to Belgrade where he founded the "Society of Refugees from South Serbia".

He worked as a professor at the Philosophical Faculty in Skopje. He is credited as one of the founders of literary history of Macedonia. His fields of research included medieval literature, 19th century literature as well as ties of Macedonian, Serbian and Croatian literatures. Polenaković became one of the first members of the Macedonian Academy of Sciences and Arts. Together with Blaže Koneski he edited the Macedonian edition of the Encyclopedia of Yugoslavia. Polenaković's collected works in five volumes were published in 1973.

References

Sources 
 Hrvatska enciklopedija http://www.enciklopedija.hr/Natuknica.aspx?ID=49102

Yugoslav historians
Lexicographers
1909 births
1984 deaths
People from Gostivar
Serbs of North Macedonia
20th-century lexicographers